Minzhong or Min Zhong may refer to:
 Central Min, a group of Min dialects spoken in central Fujian, China
 Minzhong, Zhongshan, a town in Guangdong, China
 Fuzhou, a city on the location of the Qin-era Minzhong prefecture
 Yu Minzhong (1714–1779), an official of the Qing dynasty in China